Michael Collins (born 10 May 1974 in New Plymouth, New Zealand) is a former New Zealand 'A' international rugby union player. He played for Glasgow Warriors, London Irish and Chiefs.

Rugby Union career

Amateur career

Former captain of New Plymouth Boys' High School first XV.

Professional career

He had 73 games for the provincial side Waikato.

He began his professional career playing for the New Zealand provincial Super Rugby team Chiefs. He captained the side in 1999.

He signed for Glasgow Warriors in 2007, after a two year with London Irish.

International career

Collins has played for New Zealand U19, New Zealand U21, New Zealand 'A' and New Zealand Barbarians.

Coaching career

In September 2008 Collins joined Taranaki as a rugby development manager, leaving Glasgow Warriors.

He then became the club's scrum coach.

Administration career

In 2013 was made Chief Executive.

References

External links
Glasgow Warriors sign Michael Collins
Collins completes Glasgow switch
Rugby: Veteran prop says Chiefs have new confidence

New Zealand rugby union coaches
New Zealand rugby union players
Living people
1974 births
Rugby union players from New Plymouth
Glasgow Warriors players
London Irish players
Chiefs (rugby union) players